Judah Mazive (born 1 February 1998) is a Zimbabwean professional rugby league footballer who plays as a er for the York City Knights in the Betfred Championship.

He previously played for the Wakefield Trinity Wildcats (Heritage № 1374) in the Super League.

Background
Mazive was born in Bulawayo, Zimbabwe.

Career
Mazive made his professional début for the Wakefield Trinity Wildcats in a Super 8s fixture on August 14, 2016, scoring a try in a defeat by the Warrington Wolves.

In November 2017 Mazive joined York for the 2018 season.

References

External links
York City Knights profile
Wakefield Trinity profile

1998 births
Living people
Rugby league wingers
Wakefield Trinity players
Zimbabwean rugby league players
Sportspeople from Bulawayo
York City Knights players
Zimbabwean expatriate sportspeople in England
Expatriate rugby league players in England